Bernardo Polo (died c. 1700) was a Spanish painter, active in Zaragoza, depicting still-life paintings of fruit and flowers. He worked in 1680 and died about 1700.

References

1700 deaths
Artists from Madrid
17th-century Spanish painters
Spanish male painters
Spanish Baroque painters
Spanish bodegón painters
Year of birth unknown